Love Me Strangely (also known as A Strange Love Affair, Two Girls in My Bed and A Handsome Monster) is a 1971 French-Italian drama film written and directed by Sergio Gobbi. It is loosely based on the novel Un beau monstre by Dominique Fabre. It starred Virna Lisi, Helmut Berger, Francoise Brion and Howard Vernon.

Plot    
Alain Revent sadistically abuses women. In the beginning of the movie, he is shown making his wife
find an unidentified object, most likely a bottle of medicine. The woman doesn't seem to find it and is in an intense state of terror because of the abuse Alain perpetuated with her. The woman, driven to suicide, leaps out of a window as soon as Alain leaves the room for a moment.
He enlists the aid of another pervert named Dino, known as "the handsome beast", and they proceed to emotionally torment his second wife, Nathalie. Officer Leroy begins to suspect the truth and is determined to save the unfortunate woman from Alain's clutches before she too is driven to suicide. The woman is driven to anorexia because of the abuse she has been suffering. Alain hides her bottle of medicine. 
After a visit from Alain's friend, Dino, she decides that she wants a divorce. Alain reacted in a threatening way. He proceeds to rape the woman in her sleep and use the excuse that she's pregnant as an excuse to not divorce, which came as a shock to the woman. She then recalls the moments Alain raped her.The woman runs away from her house, in fear. However, as she developed a slight dependence on Alain, she tells the officers that she doesn't need help and that Alain needs her. She stops at a hotel where she gets a call from the man, telling her that he's coming to find her. 
After they reunite, they kiss passionately, then they go home, quietly. However, in the last scene of the movie, the police are shown investigating something that is revealed to be the bodies of Nathalie and Alain next to each other on the ground. The two spouses have most likely committed suicide together.

Cast 

 Virna Lisi : Nathalie Revent 
 Helmut Berger : Alain Revent 
 Charles Aznavour : Inspector Leroy 
 Alain Noury : Dino 
 Françoise Brion : Jacqueline 
 Édith Scob : Sylvie Revent 
 Marc Cassot : Vincent 
 Yves Brainville : Commissioner Dedru
 Henri Crémieux : Professor Richet 
 André Chanu : Dr. Schwartz
 Jacques Castelot :  Wassermann
 Georges Berthomieu : Toxicolog 
 Guy Marly : Chemist 
 Michel Peyrelon : Maître d'hôtel 
 Dominique Marcas : Une voisine
 Howard Vernon : Administrateur de biens
 Robert Berri : Concierge d'Alain 
 Seda Aznavour : Voisine d'Alain 
 Paul Pavel : Livreur
 Paul Bonifas : Portier de l'hôtel
 Alberto Farnese : Alain's friend

References

External links

1971 films
1971 drama films
French drama films
Italian drama films
Films directed by Sergio Gobbi
Films based on French novels
1970s French films
1970s Italian films